Freetime is the fifth album by Spyro Gyra, released in 1981. At Billboard magazine, the album reached No. 41 on the Top 200 albums chart and No. 1 on that magazine's Jazz Albums chart.

Track listing

Personnel 
Spyro Gyra
 Jay Beckenstein – alto saxophone, soprano saxophone, tenor saxophone, clay flute, percussion
 Tom Schuman – acoustic piano, Fender Rhodes, synthesizers
 Jeremy Wall – acoustic piano, synthesizers 
 Chet Catallo – guitar
 John Tropea – guitar
 Dave Samuels – vibraphone, marimba
 Eli Konikoff – drums
 Gerardo Velez – percussion

Guests
 Rob Mounsey – synthesizers, backing vocals
 Richard Tee – acoustic piano (7), Fender Rhodes (7)
 Steve Khan – guitar (3)
 Will Lee – bass, backing vocals
 Errol "Crusher" Bennett – percussion
 Richard Calandra – cymbal (4)
 Randy Brecker – trumpet (1)
 David Darling – cello (4)
 Kasey Cisyk – backing vocals
 Valerie Simpson – backing vocals

Production 
 Jay Beckenstein – producer 
 Richard Calandra – producer
 Jeremy Wall – assistant producer
 Michael Barry – recording, mixing 
 Steve Baldwin – recording assistant 
 Charles Conrad – mixing
 Julian Robertson – mix assistant
 Bob Ludwig – mastering 
 David Heffernan – artwork, design

Studios
 Recorded at Secret Sound (New York, NY).
 Mixed at House of Music (West Orange, NJ).
 Mastered at Masterdisk (New York, NY).

References

1981 albums
Spyro Gyra albums
MCA Records albums